An object manager is a concept, and often a piece of software, found in object-oriented programming. The object manager provides rules for retention, naming and security of objects.

Object (computer science)